San Giorgio Canavese is a town and comune in the Metropolitan City of Turin in the region of Piedmont, northern Italy.

The main attraction is the castle, once a possession of the Novarese counts of Biandrate.

Near San Giorgio in San Giusto there is a Pininfarina factory.

The body of Giorgio di Biandrate is interred in the town's church.

Economy

In San Giorgio Canavese there was a Pininfarina car factory. The factory has produced several car models, including Ferrari Testarossa and Peugeot 406 Coupé.

Twin towns  
San Giorgio Canavese is twinned with:

  Campello sul Clitunno, Perugia, Italy

External links
Official website  
San Giorgio Castle 

Castles in Italy